The 1992 Pro Bowl was the NFL's 42nd annual all-star game which featured the outstanding performers from the 1991 season. The game was played on Sunday, February 2, 1992, at Aloha Stadium in Honolulu, Hawaii before a crowd of 50,209. The final score was NFC 21, AFC 15.

Dan Reeves of the Denver Broncos led the AFC team against an NFC team coached by Detroit Lions head coach Wayne Fontes. The referee was Gerald Austin.

Michael Irvin of the Dallas Cowboys was the game's MVP. Players on the winning NFC team received $10,000 apiece while the AFC participants each took home $5,000.

AFC roster

Offense

Defense

Special teams

NFC roster

Offense

Defense

Special teams

References

External links

Pro Bowl
Pro Bowl
Pro Bowl
Pro Bowl
Pro Bowl
American football competitions in Honolulu
February 1992 sports events in the United States